Luis d'Andrea (February 23, 1934 – September 8, 2012) was the Roman Catholic bishop of the Roman Catholic Diocese of Caxias do Maranhão, Brazil.

Ordained to the priesthood in 1959, d'Andrea was named bishop in 1987 and retired in 2010.

Notes

21st-century Roman Catholic bishops in Brazil
1934 births
2012 deaths
20th-century Roman Catholic bishops in Brazil
Roman Catholic bishops of Caxias do Maranhão